SS Julius Rosenwald was a Liberty ship built in the United States during World War II. She was named after Julius Rosenwald, co-owner of Sears, Roebuck and Company, founder of the Rosenwald Fund, and principal founder and backer of the Museum of Science and Industry in Chicago.

Construction
Julius Rosenwald was laid down on 7 July 1943, under a Maritime Commission (MARCOM) contract, MC hull 1533, by J.A. Jones Construction, Panama City, Florida; she was launched on 13 September 1943.

History
She was allocated to Blidberg & Rothchild Co., Inc., on 29 September 1943. On 15 December 1946, she was sold to the Italian Government, for $544,506, which in turn sold her to Adriatica Socite Anon di Navigazione, on 27 December 1946. She was renamed Assiria and scrapped in 1963.

References

Bibliography

 
 
 
 

 

Liberty ships
Ships built in Panama City, Florida
1943 ships
Liberty ships transferred to Italy